Bratnice is a small settlement in the Municipality of Ivančna Gorica in central Slovenia. The area is part of the historical region of Lower Carniola and is now included in the Central Slovenia Statistical Region.

Name
Bratnice was attested in written sources as Brüdern in 1250, Ad fratres in 1300, Prätenicz in 1420, and Pruederen in 1505.

References

External links
Bratnice on Geopedia

Populated places in the Municipality of Ivančna Gorica